Tele Antillas is a television network operating out of Santo Domingo in the Dominican Republic. It provides a wide variety of television programs which are available to viewers throughout the Dominican Republic on channel 2. Originally the country's Southern and Capital Zones tuned in on channel 2, while the Northern Zone received it from channel 13. During the 1990s, the Dominican government implemented regulations which required networks to operate key stations and relayers on one channel throughout the entire country. Since then, all of Tele Antillas stations are now on channel 2.

History

Established during October 1979, Tele Antillas was soon considered one of the most modern television channels providing media content in the Dominican Republic. It was the first TV channel to utilize stereophonics. Additionally, it was among the pioneering channels that initially introduced programming based largely on international productions such as telenovelas, television series, films and animated cartoons. Despite incorporating an international approach, they continued producing several local programs developed specifically for the family audience. During the 1990s, the station was acquired by Grupo Corripio, which also owns Telesistema Canal 11, and later relaunched with a new programming format. Today, many international events like the Oscars, Emmys, and some of most popular events in Latin America, such as the Festival Internacional de la Canción de Viña del Mar are viewed on Tele Antillas Canal 2.

It was one of the first channels in the Dominican Republic to offer foreign made programming from Brazil and Venezuela. One of their most successful ventures was a popular late night schedule that included well-known telenovelas like Ronda de Piedra, Doña Bella and Xica da Silva among others. In 2004 the TV station was relaunched with a new logo and programming that was designed to appeal to a wider variety of viewing demographics.

Slogans
 "Tele Antillas, Canal 2 en Santo Domingo y 13 en Santiago" (1980s) 
 "Tele Antillas, Tu Canal ...!" (1990s) 
 "Tele Antillas, Ahora y siempre... Lo Mejor" (1990s) 
 "Tele Antillas, TV como eres tú" (2004)

Some Programs Produced on Tele Antillas
 Fiesta 
 Uno + Uno 
 Sube y baja del 2 
 El show de la noche 
 De buen humor 
 7 x 7 Roberto (segunda etapa) 
 Sección 2 
 Noticiero Teleantillas 
 Cine club 2 
 Conecta - 2 
 Ciro Cocina
 Iamdra full 
 Béisbol an estilo Teleantillas (Temporada béisbol invernal 1985–1986) 
 El show de robertico 
 100 grados (segunda etapa)
 Irene Narpier Entre Puntos

Current programming 
Weekdays:
 5:00am A Quien Madruga
 6:00am Uno + Uno
 9:00am Pare de Sufrir
 10:00am Tele-Fit
 10:30am Pauta Cami/Cocinarte
 11:00am Luna la heredera
 12:00pm Caso Cerrado
 12:45pm Noticiero Teleantillas
 1:00pm La Viuda Joven
 2:00pm Cuchicheos
 3:00pm La Loba
 4:00pm Hechiceras
 5:00pm Iamdra Full
 5:45pm Noticiero Teleantillas
 6:00pm Deseos de Mujer

Primetime:
 7:00pm Decisiones
 8:00pm Cine Club 2
 10:00pm Ojo Por Ojo
 11:00pm India
 11:45pm Noticiero Teleantillas
 12:00am Te Llamo

Weekends Primetime:
 7:00am Temas del Cibao (Saturdays Only)
 7:00am Crees Esto (Sundays Only)
 7:30am Cine Infantil (Saturdays Only)
 8:00am De Buena fuente (Sundays Only)
 8:30am Figuras del Deporte (Sundays Only)
 9:00am La Voz del detallista (Sundays Only)
 9:30am Comentarios en detalle (Sundays Only)
 10:00am Fenacerd TV (Sundays Only)
 10:30am Club de Pelicula (Sundays Only)
 1:00pm That's so Raven
 1:30pm Phil of the Future
 2:00pm What I Like About You
 2:30pm Dos Hombres y medio
 3:00pm Novela y mas
 4:00pm World's Most Amazing Videos
 5:00pm Thurhold (Saturdays Only)
 5:00pm Ripley IV (Sundays Only)
 6:00pm Supernatural
 7:00pm Lost
 8:00pm Movie (Saturdays Only)
 8:00pm Trialogo (Sundays Only) with Andy Dauhajre, Jaime Aristy Escuder, Wilfredo Alemany.
 9:00pm Jornada Extra (Sundays Only)
 10:00pm D' Calle Con Dafne (Saturdays Only)
 11:00 p.m Ser Humano with Maria Elena Núñez (Saturdays Only)
 11:30pm Que Onda Noche (Sundays Only)
 12:30am En Sociedad (Sundays Only)

Notes

External links
 Tele Antillas Official Website

Television stations in the Dominican Republic
Spanish-language television stations
Television channels and stations established in 1979